This article is a list of diseases of pigeon peas (Cajanus cajan).

Bacterial diseases

Fungal diseases

Nematodes, parasitic

Viral diseases

Miscellaneous diseases and disorders

References
Common Names of Diseases, The American Phytopathological Society

Phaseoleae
Pigeonpea